Quadriptilia is a genus of moths in the family Pterophoridae.

Species
Quadriptilia obscurodactyla Gielis, 1994
Quadriptilia philorectis (Meyrick, 1926)
Quadriptilia rectangulodactyla Gielis, 1994

Pterophorinae
Moth genera